

The Caspar C 32 was an aircraft developed in Germany for aerial spraying in the late 1920s. It was a single-bay biplane with staggered, equal-span wings that accommodated the pilot and a single passenger or observer in tandem open cockpits. A small, additional horizontal stabiliser was fitted near the top of the tall single tail fin above the main horizontal stabiliser.

Design and development
The first example was used by the Biologische Reichsanstalt für Land- und Forstwirtschaft in Berlin until the early 1930s, before being acquired by DVS in 1933. DVS also purchased two examples directly from Caspar.

Operational history
The fourth and last C 32 built was bought by the Graf Solms-Laubach and named Germania. Otto Könnecke was to have made a transatlantic crossing with it, but ongoing bad weather led to the continuous postponing of the event. Eventually, the plan was changed to making an eastward flight to the United States, via India and Japan. Könnecke departed Cologne on 27 September 1927, but by early 1928 was forced to turn back having only reached India.

Specifications (C 32)

References

Further reading

External links
 German Aircraft Between 1919-1945

1920s German agricultural aircraft
C032
Biplanes
Single-engined tractor aircraft
Aircraft first flown in 1928